The following is a list of highest-grossing musical films of all time, the highest-grossing musical film franchises, the biggest opening weekends for musical films, and the highest admissions at the box office.

Highest-grossing musical films
Note that the following gross figures are nominal, not adjusted for inflation, and do not take into account rising ticket prices, or differences in ticket prices between different countries. When adjusted for inflation, the highest-grossing musical films are The Sound of Music, with an inflation-adjusted worldwide gross of $; followed by Snow White and the Seven Dwarfs, with an inflation-adjusted worldwide gross of $ (both as of 2019). The top five films are among the highest-grossing films of all time.

Highest-grossing opening weekends
The following is a list of the biggest opening weekends for musical films worldwide.

Timeline of gross records

Highest-grossing musical films

Highest-grossing opening weekends

Highest-grossing musical films by year

The following is a list of highest-grossing musical film by year. Disney tops the list 28 times. All films in Saturday Night Fever, Beauty and the Beast, The Lion King, Rio are on the list, along with Alvin and the Chipmunks franchises are the most represented franchises each have two films on the list.

 ( ... ) Since grosses are not limited to original theatrical runs, a film's first-run gross is included in brackets after the total if known.

Highest-grossing musical film series and film franchises
Note that the following gross figures are nominal, not adjusted for inflation, and do not take into account increasing ticket prices.

A series must have at least two theatrically released films.

Box-office admissions (ticket sales)

The following table lists known estimated box-office ticket sales for various high-grossing musical films that have sold at least 75million tickets worldwide.

Note that some of the data are incomplete due to a lack of available admissions data from a number of countries. Therefore, it is not an exhaustive list of all the highest-grossing musical films by ticket sales, so no rankings are given.

See also 
 Lists of musicals
 List of highest-grossing musical theatre productions
 List of highest-grossing films
 List of highest-grossing Bollywood films
 List of highest-grossing non-English films
 List of multimedia franchises
 List of highest-grossing media franchises
 Long-running theatre productions
 Broadway shows
 West End shows

Notes

Footnotes

References

Musicals
Musical
Highest-grossing musical films
Highest-grossing musical films